The Seoul Central Mosque is a mosque opened in 1976 in Itaewon, Seoul, South Korea. It is located in Hannam-dong, Yongsan District. It holds lectures in English, Arabic, and Korean. Friday prayers regularly attract between four hundred and five hundred worshipers in the afternoon, though regular attendance has sometimes been known to climb as high as eight hundred people.

History
In the decade or so before the construction of the mosque, the Korean Muslim Federation (originally known as the Korean Muslim Society) held services in a makeshift prayer hall located in the downtown area of Seoul. Fewer than three thousand Muslims were known to be living in Korea at the time.

President Park Chung-hee offered the Korean Muslim Federation land on which to build a proper mosque as a gesture of good will to potential Middle Eastern allies for the still young Republic of Korea. The governments of Saudi Arabia and several other Middle Eastern nations responded by providing funds to aid in the construction of the mosque. Most of the funds came from Saudi Arabia.

Within one year of the opening of Seoul Central Mosque, the number of Muslims in Korea rose from less than three thousand to over fifteen thousand. That number rose again sharply to around one hundred fifty thousand with the large influx of foreign workers from Muslim countries such as Pakistan, Bangladesh, and Indonesia in the 1990s. Today there are an estimated one hundred thousand Muslims in South Korea (though some estimates suggest there being as many as two hundred thousand).

Since the opening of Seoul Central Mosque, seven more mosques have been built throughout Korea. However, Seoul Central Mosque remains the only mosque in the Seoul Capital Area and thus it serves as the functional hub of the Islamic cultural community in Seoul. A busy commercial area has developed around the mosque, primarily centered around the sale and preparation of Middle Eastern cuisine and other halal food.

While the 2007 South Korean hostage crisis in Afghanistan was underway, Seoul Central Mosque became the location of several anti-Islamic protests by Christian groups and the recipient of various bomb threats, to the point where a significant increase in police presence was deemed necessary to prevent an attack on worshipers or else on the building itself.

Architecture
The mosque is also noted for its characteristically Islamic design. The large minarets on the building and the engraved Arabic calligraphy near its entrance are noteworthy in particular as being as out of place among the more standard Korean architecture that makes up the rest of Itaewon.

See also

Islam in Korea
List of first mosques by country

References

External links

Korea Muslim Federation Up to date news (Korean and English)
Religious Services in Seoul
Mosques in Korea

1976 establishments in South Korea
Mosques completed in 1976
Bangladeshi diaspora in Asia
Buildings and structures in Yongsan District
Indonesian diaspora in Asia
Middle Eastern diaspora in Asia
Mosques in South Korea
Pakistani diaspora in Asia
Religious buildings and structures in Seoul
Sunni Islam in Asia
Sunni mosques
Itaewon
20th-century architecture in South Korea